The Central District of Manujan County is a district (bakhsh) in Manujan County, Kerman Province, Iran. At the 2006 census, its population was 38,709, in 8,019 families.  The district has one city: Manujan. The district has three rural districts (dehestan): Geshmiran Rural District, Nurabad Rural District, and Qaleh Rural District.

References 

Manujan County
Districts of Kerman Province